Şen is a Turkish surname. The meaning of the word is very happy and lively.

Notable people
 Ali Şen, Turkish actor
 Eren Şen, German-Turkish footballer
Ersan Şen (born 1966), Turkish lawyer and academic
 Gülhan Şen, Turkish television presenter, producer, and speaker
H. Nida Sen, Turkish ophthalmologist
 Şener Şen, Turkish actor
 Volkan Şen, Turkish footballer

See also 

 Sen (surname)

Turkish-language surnames